USS Titan may refer to:
 USS Titan, a fictional aircraft carrier in Battlefield 4
 , a fictional spacecraft in the Star Trek universe
 , a fictional spacecraft in the Star Trek universe

See also
 Titan (disambiguation)